Heart's Reflections is a two-disc studio album by American jazz trumpeter Wadada Leo Smith. The album was released on May 16, 2011 via  Cuneiform Records label.

Reception
Glen Hall of Exclaim! stated "Trumpeter Smith wears his love for Miles Davis on his sleeve. And the vibe of Heart's Reflections echoes Electric-era Miles, with wah-wah, electric trumpet, yowling guitars, rock-solid drumming and jangling electric piano. But where Miles' music exuded sexuality, most of Smith's two-CD set is ostensibly dedicated to Sufi saint Abu al-Hasan al-Shadhili... Even with a heavy-on-electronics, 14-piece group, Smith's music is consistently focused and expressive.

Phil Johnson of The Independent wrote "The astonishing 20-minute opening track might be called "Don Cherry's Electric Sonic Garden", but it's the wheedling tone and furious backbeat of the late Miles Davis that veteran free-jazz trumpeter Smith makes you think of most. Four electric guitarists among an ensemble of 14, with two laptop operatives squiggling away. You can argue that nothing on the double-CD quite equals it, or question the context of mystic spirituality, but Smith has made electric jazz sound dangerous again".

Track listing
Disc 1

Disc 2

Personnel
Wadada Leo Smith – trumpet
Pheeroan akLaff – drums, soloist
Casey Anderson – sax (alto)
Charlie Burgin – laptop, soloist
Casey Butler – sax (tenor)
Josh Gerowitz – guitar (electric), soloist
Michael Gregory Jackson – guitar (electric), mixing, producer, soloist
John Lindberg – bass (acoustic), soloist
Brandon Ross – guitar (electric), soloist
Angelica Sanchez – piano, soloist, Wurlitzer piano
Lamar Smith – guitar (electric)
Stephanie Smith – soloist, violin
Skúli Sverrisson – six-string bass, bass (electric), soloist
Mark Trayle – laptop, soloist

References

Wadada Leo Smith albums
2011 albums
Cuneiform Records albums